Panna Udvardy was the defending champion but chose to compete at the 2022 Grand Prix SAR La Princesse Lalla Meryem instead.

María Carlé won the title, defeating Elvina Kalieva in the final, 6–1, 6–1.

Seeds

Draw

Finals

Top half

Bottom half

References

Main Draw

Pelham Racquet Club Pro Classic - Singles